(born ; November 22, 1843 – April 10, 1886), later known as the nun , was a Japanese woman from the late Edo period to the Meiji period. She was formerly a geisha under the stage name  from Sanbongi, Kyoto. She was the lover (and later the wife) of Katsura Kogorō (later Kido Takayoshi), who would go on to become one of the Three Great Nobles of the Restoration.

References

1843 births
1886 deaths
Geishas
People of Edo-period Japan
Meiji Restoration
19th-century Japanese people
People from Obama domain